Chen Hao-wei (born 30 April 1992) is a Taiwanese professional footballer who currently plays as a center forward for Taiwan Football Premier League club Taichung Futuro.

Club career

Eastern
On 17 July 2019, Eastern unveiled Chen as one of their newest players. He signed a two-year contract with the club.

On 11 December 2020, Chen left the club.

Honours
Eastern
 Hong Kong Senior Shield: 2019–20
 Hong Kong FA Cup: 2019–20

Personal life
Chen is a member of the Amis people hailing from Fenglin Township and is also fluently speaks the native language in addition to Chinese. He is also a Christian who thanks his family and God for success.

Career statistics

Club
Statistics accurate as of match played 11 December 2020.

International goals

Scores and results list Chinese Taipei's goal tally first.

References

External links

1992 births
Living people
Taiwanese footballers
Chinese Taipei international footballers
Association football midfielders
Association football forwards
Taiwanese expatriate footballers
China League One players
Beijing Sport University F.C. players
Expatriate footballers in China
Hong Kong Premier League players
Eastern Sports Club footballers
Expatriate footballers in Hong Kong
People from Hualien County
Taiwanese Christians
Amis people
Hang Yuen F.C. players